Limnocyon ("swamp dog") is an extinct paraphyletic genus of limnocyonid hyaenodonts that lived in North America during the middle Eocene. Fossils of this animal have been found in California, Utah and Wyoming.

Description
Limnocyon was a small omnivorous hyaenodontid, with some estimates placing it at less than 1 kg in weight. Like other limnocyonids, Limnocyon had only two molars in the upper and lower dentition.

Phylogeny
The phylogenetic relationships of genus Limnocyon are shown in the following cladogram.

See also
 Mammal classification
 Limnocyonidae

References

Hyaenodonts
Eocene mammals
Eocene mammals of North America
Eocene genus first appearances
Fossil taxa described in 1872
Prehistoric placental genera